The Cocktail Waitress is a novel by James M. Cain published posthumously in 2012 by Hard Case Crime press.

The last of Cain's novels, this so-called “lost” work was assembled from a number of undated manuscripts by archivist and novelist Charles Ardai.

The Cocktail Waitress resembles Cain's 1941 novel Mildred Pierce in plot and theme, but, in contrast, employs a first-person point-of-view to tell the tragic story of heroine Joan Medford rather than the  third-person narration he used in the earlier work.

Plot

Publication History

Upon completing his penultimate novel, The Institute (1976) in 1975, Cain began writing a historical novel story similar in plot and theme to his successful 1941 novel Mildred Pierce. This work would appear 37 years later as The Cocktail Waitress.

Cain, conflicted as to what narrative point-of-view he would employ, began the story using the third-person. Unsatisfied with the effect, Cain “once and for all” committed himself to a first-person confessional narration, rewriting the work in the “lingo” of his female protagonist, Joan Medford.

Cain worked on The Cocktail Waitress throughout 1975. He sent a manuscript to his agent Dorothy Olding. Publisher Orlando Petrocelli requested a rewrite of the ending, and when Cain failed to deliver satisfactory edits, Petrocelli and Olding shelved the novel. The Cocktail Waitress existed in several incomplete and undated drafts when Cain died on October 27, 1977, at age 85.

Novelist and archivist Charles Ardai was alerted to the existence of these manuscripts by Cain biographer Roy Hoopes in 2002. He discovered the “long lost” drafts and assembled The Cocktail Waitress, published in 2012 long dash 35 years after the author's death.

Critical Assessment

Critic Len Gurkin on The Cocktail Waitress:

Literary critic Michael Connelly on The Cocktail Waitress:

Footnotes

Sources 
Connelly, Michael. 2012. Last Call. The New York Times. 23 September 2012. https://www.nytimes.com/2012/09/23/books/review/the-cocktail-waitress-by-james-m-cain.html  Retrieved 10 July 2022.
Gutkin, Len. 2012. The Terrifying Wish that Comes True: On Cain's 'The Cocktail Waitress. The Los Angeles Review of Books. 16 September 2012. https://lareviewofbooks.org/article/the-terrifying-wish-that-comes-true-on-cains-the-cocktail-waitress/  Retrieved 10 July 2022.
Tucker, Neely. 2012. Long lost James M. Cain novel published. The Washington Post. 27 September 2012. https://www.washingtonpost.com/lifestyle/style/long-lost-james-m-cain-novel-published/2012/09/27/dd1046c4-074e-11e2-858a-5311df86ab04_story.html  Retrieved 10 August 2022.

2012 American novels